Electrapate martynovi is an extinct species of beetles in the family Schizopodidae, the only species in the genus Electrapate.

References

Schizopodidae
†
†